Edward O'Neill, O'Neil or O'Neal may refer to:

Politicians
Edward O'Neill, 2nd Baron O'Neill (1839–1928), Irish peer and Conservative politician
Edward O'Neill (Wisconsin politician) (1820–1890), Mayor of Milwaukee, Wisconsin
Edward J. O'Neill (Rhode Island politician), Rhode Island state senator
Edward L. O'Neill (1903–1948), American politician in New Jersey

Sportspeople
Ed O'Neil (Edward William O'Neil, born 1952), former American football coach and NFL linebacker
Ed O'Neil (baseball) (Edward J. O'Neil, 1859–1892), Major League Baseball pitcher

Military
Edward A. O'Neal (1818–1890), Confederate general during the American Civil War
Edward J. O'Neill (general) (1902–1979), U.S. military officer during World War II

Others
Ed O'Neill (born 1946), American actor and comedian
Ed O'Neal, American gospel singer
Edward O'Neill (actor) (1862–1938), British actor

See also
O'Neill (disambiguation)